Angela Grisar (born May 2, 1973) is a Chilean retired racquetball player. She was the first South American woman's racquetball player to finish in the top 10 on the women's pro tour, doing so six straight seasons (2003-04 to 2008-09). She won numerous medals for Chile in international competitions, including at four International Racquetball Federation (IRF) World Championships and three Pan American Games.

International career 

Grisar was runner up in singles at the World Championships twice: in 2004, when she lost to Cheryl Gudinas in the final in Anyang, South Korea, and 2006, Canadian Christie Van Hees in the final in Santo Domingo, Dominican Republic.

Grisar has also been runner up in doubles twice at Worlds. She did it in 2006 with  Fabiola Marquez, when they lost to Americans Laura Fenton and Aimee Ruiz, and in 2012 with Carla Muñoz, when they lost to Paola Longoria and Samantha Salas. Her latest medal at Worlds came in 2014, when she was a bronze medalist in Women's Doubles with Carla Muñoz.

Grisar was a double medalist at the 2006 Pan American Championships, when she got bronze in singles and silver in doubles with Fabiola Marquez.

In 2007, she was again a bronze medalist in singles at the Pan American Championships, and again a silver medalist in doubles with Marquez at the 2008 Pan American Championships.

Grisar has two doubles medals with Carla Muñoz. They got bronze at the  2011 Pan American Games, and at the 2013 Pan American Championships.

Grisar has three other bronze medals in singles: one from the 2004 Pan American Championships, when she lost to Canadian Lori-Jane Powell in the semi-finals, one from the 2011 Pan American Championships, when she lost to Samantha Salas in semi-finals, and the other at the 2009 World Games in Kaohsiung, Taiwan.

Professional career 
Grisar won one  women's pro  tournament, which came in 2007 in Miami, where she defeated Kerri Wachtel in the final, Rhonda Rajsich in the semi-finals and Kristen Walsh Bellows in the quarter finals. She was a semi-finalist at the US Open in 2007 and a US Open quarter finalist on five other occasions.

Over her career, Grisar was a top 10 player on the women's pro tour rankings for six consecutive seasons from 2003–04 to 2008–09. Her highest ranking was 4th at the end of the 2006–07 and 2007–08 seasons.

Personal life
Grisar currently lives in San Ramon, California, where she is a health club manager in Fremont, California. She graduated from the Universidad Católica de Chile in 1997 (journalism & social communication) and the Universidad de Chile in 2006 (masters in anthropology & social development).

See also 
 List of racquetball players

References

External links 
 

Living people
Racquetball players at the 2011 Pan American Games
1973 births
People from Santiago
Racquetball players at the 2015 Pan American Games
Chilean racquetball players
Pan American Games bronze medalists for Chile
World Games bronze medalists
Pan American Games medalists in racquetball
Competitors at the 2009 World Games
Racquetball players at the 1999 Pan American Games
Racquetball players at the 2003 Pan American Games
Competitors at the 2013 World Games
Medalists at the 1999 Pan American Games
Medalists at the 2003 Pan American Games
Medalists at the 2011 Pan American Games
21st-century Chilean women